Villaralbo Club de Fútbol is a football team based in Villaralbo in the autonomous community of Castile and León. Founded in 2001, it plays in Primera Regional. Its stadium is Ciudad Deportiva Fernández García with a capacity of 2,500 seats.

Season to season

7 seasons in Tercera División

Former players
 David Cordón

External links
 Futbolme team profile 

Football clubs in Castile and León
Association football clubs established in 2001
2001 establishments in Spain
Province of Zamora